The meridian 45° west of Greenwich is a line of longitude that extends from the North Pole across the Arctic Ocean, Greenland, the Atlantic Ocean, South America, the Southern Ocean, and Antarctica to the South Pole.

In Greenland the meridian defines the borders of Avannaata, Qeqertalik, and Qeqqata municipalities with the Sermersooq municipality and the North East Greenland National Park.

The 45th meridian west forms a great circle with the 135th meridian east, and it is the reference meridian for the time zone UTC-3.

From Pole to Pole
Starting at the North Pole and heading south to the South Pole, the 45th meridian west passes through:

{| class="wikitable plainrowheaders"
! scope="col" width="120" | Co-ordinates
! scope="col" | Country, territory or sea
! scope="col" | Notes
|-
| style="background:#b0e0e6;" | 
! scope="row" style="background:#b0e0e6;" | Arctic Ocean
| style="background:#b0e0e6;" |
|-
| style="background:#b0e0e6;" | 
! scope="row" style="background:#b0e0e6;" | Lincoln Sea
| style="background:#b0e0e6;" |
|-
| 
! scope="row" | 
|Nansen Land
|-
| style="background:#b0e0e6;" | 
! scope="row" style="background:#b0e0e6;" | J.P. Koch Fjord
| style="background:#b0e0e6;" |
|-
| 
! scope="row" | 
| Freuchen Land
|-
| style="background:#b0e0e6;" | 
! scope="row" style="background:#b0e0e6;" | Nordenskiöld Fjord
| style="background:#b0e0e6;" |
|-
| 
! scope="row" | 
| Island of Nares Land
|-
| style="background:#b0e0e6;" | 
! scope="row" style="background:#b0e0e6;" | Victoria Fjord
| style="background:#b0e0e6;" |
|-
| 
! scope="row" | 
|C. H. Ostenfeldt Glacier
|-
| style="background:#b0e0e6;" | 
! scope="row" style="background:#b0e0e6;" | Atlantic Ocean
| style="background:#b0e0e6;" |
|-
| 
! scope="row" | 
| Maranhão — Mirinzal Island
|-
| style="background:#b0e0e6;" | 
! scope="row" style="background:#b0e0e6;" | Atlantic Ocean
| style="background:#b0e0e6;" |
|-valign="top"
| 
! scope="row" | 
| Maranhão Piauí — from  Bahia — from  Minas Gerais — from  São Paulo — from 
|-
| style="background:#b0e0e6;" | 
! scope="row" style="background:#b0e0e6;" | Atlantic Ocean
| style="background:#b0e0e6;" |
|-
| style="background:#b0e0e6;" | 
! scope="row" style="background:#b0e0e6;" | Southern Ocean
| style="background:#b0e0e6;" |
|-valign="top"
| 
! scope="row" | South Orkney Islands
|-
| style="background:#b0e0e6;" | 
! scope="row" style="background:#b0e0e6;" | Southern Ocean
| style="background:#b0e0e6;" |
|-valign="top"
| 
! scope="row" | Antarctica
|-
|}

See also
44th meridian west
46th meridian west

w045 meridian west
Borders of Greenland